Billy James Gobble (born July 19, 1981) is a former Major League Baseball pitcher who last played in the Colorado Rockies organization.

High school career
Gobble attended John S. Battle High School in Bristol, Virginia and started four years on the varsity team. He led the team to three state tournament appearances and compiled a 32-8 record and 512 strikeouts.

As a senior, he was 10-1 with a 0.49 ERA, striking out 151 and allowing just 23 hits in 71 innings of work. His only loss came at the hands of Sullivan East High School, which is located in nearby Bluff City, Tennessee. He was also a strong hitter, compiling a .493 batting average with nine home runs, 30 RBI and 24 walks.

He signed a baseball scholarship with the University of Kentucky before being drafted by the Royals with the 43rd pick in the 1999 Major League Baseball draft. Gobble was the fourth Royal chosen, following Kyle Snyder, Mike MacDougal, and Jay Gehrke.

Professional career

Kansas City Royals
He steadily improved through his first three seasons; in  he appeared in 74 games, the most on Kansas City's staff and tied for fifth in the American League. Gobble was 4-1 with a 3.02 earned run average.

On July 21, Gobble surrendered 10 runs to the Detroit Tigers in the eighth inning, setting a Kansas City franchise record for the most runs surrendered in a game by a relief pitcher.

He was released by the Royals on March 18, .

Texas Rangers
On March 21, the Texas Rangers signed Gobble to a minor league contract and invited him to spring training. He was released on March 30.

Chicago White Sox
On April 5, 2009, the Chicago White Sox signed Gobble to a minor league contract and assigned him to the Triple-A Charlotte Knights.

The Chicago White Sox promoted him from Triple-A Charlotte Knights on Monday, May 11, 2009 to take the roster spot of struggling starter José Contreras.

On July 7, 2009, he was designated for assignment.

Colorado Rockies
On January 28, 2010, Gobble signed a minor league contract with the Colorado Rockies with an invite to spring training. He did not allow a hit in three Cactus League outings and appeared to have locked up a spot as the team's left-handed specialist before suffering an injury.

He appeared in two games for the Class AAA Colorado Springs Sky Sox before retiring.

References

External links

1981 births
Living people
Kansas City Royals players
Chicago White Sox players
People from Bristol, Tennessee
Baseball players from Tennessee
Major League Baseball pitchers
Gulf Coast Royals players
Charleston AlleyCats players
Wilmington Blue Rocks players
Wichita Wranglers players
Omaha Royals players
Charlotte Knights players
Colorado Springs Sky Sox players